The A55 road is a major road in north Wales.

Other notable roads include:
 A55 highway (Australia), a road connecting St George, Queensland and Lithgow, New South Wales
 A55 motorway (Canada), a road in Québec connecting Stanstead and Shawinigan
 A55 motorway (France), a road connecting Marseille and Martigues
 Autostrada A55 (Italy), a bypass around Turin
 A55 road (Northern Ireland), a road around Belfast